There have been 12 modern Olympic athletes who have an intersex (disorders of sex development) condition. The 1932 Summer Olympics was the first instance of an athlete now known to be intersex competing, also winning a medal. 6 have won a medal (50% of intersex athletes), with 3 winning at least one gold (25% of intersex athletes). East German athletes dosed with androgen are not included.

Prior to widespread sex verification in sports, intersex athletes generally competed unknowing of their condition. Since the 1990s, most intersex athletes have known of their condition prior to competing, due to various tests carried out at other events. The majority of intersex Olympians have competed in athletics, generally running.

Overview

Key 

 Tables are default sorted by first Games appearance chronologically, then current surname or common nickname alphabetically, then first name alphabetically. They can be sorted by current surname (where used) or common nickname alphabetically; by country and sport alphabetically; by Games chronologically; and by medals as organised in Olympics medals tables.

Intersex athletes

Notes

References

Sources 

Lists of LGBT-related people
intersex
Intersex-related lists